Mursi may refer to:

People

Surname
Abdullah Morsi (1994–2019), son of former President Mohamed Morsi
Abu al-Abbas al-Mursi (1219–1287), Sufi saint
Ahmed Morsi (born 1930), Egyptian artist
Ali Ali El Morsi, Egyptian chief scout, former vice-president of the Egyptian Federation for Scouts and Girl Guides
Basem Morsy (born 1992), Egyptian footballer
Haydy Morsy (born 1999), Egyptian modern pentathlete
Khalil Morsi (1946–2014), Egyptian actor
Maya Morsy, Egyptian political and scientist
Midhat Mursi (1953–2008), Egyptian chemist
Mohamed Morsi (1951–2019), Egyptian politician, 5th President of Egypt
Mohamed El-Morsy (born 1986), Egyptian footballer
Pamela Morsi (born 1951), American writer 
Saleh Morsi (1929–1996), Egyptian screenwriter and novelist 
Sally Mursi (born 1968), Egyptian entertainer
Sam Morsy (born 1991), English-born Egyptian footballer
Tareq Ali Mursi, Egyptian terrorist, alleged member of Egyptian Islamic Jihad

Given name
Morsi El Sayed Hegazy (born 1948), Egyptian academic and economist

Middle name
Hania Morsi Fadl, Sudanese radiologist, CEO of the Khartoum Breast Cancer Center

Other uses
Mursi people, a Nilotic pastoralist ethnic group in Ethiopia (also known as the Mun people)
Mursi language
Mursi, a village in Xarrë municipality, Albania

See also
Abu al-Abbas al-Mursi Mosque, a mosque in Alexandria, Egypt

Language and nationality disambiguation pages